Carla Bianco is an American singer-songwriter, pianist and actor.

Career 
Of Italian descent, Carla Bianco grew up singing at family parties, and began writing songs at the age of 10 on the piano.

In 1990, she worked with Jellybean Benitez of Jellybean Productions, Madonna's producer, and had her first song, Not This Time, released on Atlantic Records. She also wrote with Narada Michael Walden, Judd Friedman, Reggie Lucas.
In 1996, one of her songs The lover that you are was #1 on the Billboard Hot Dance Club Play chart, covered by Pulse. It reached No. 22 in the UK Singles Chart in May 1996.

On stage Carla played the role of Maureen in Rent on Broadway and Los Angeles.

She also performed in movies including Unstoppable with Denzel Washington and Promised Land with Matt Damon.

Carla released her debut CD, All This Time in 2012.

Filmography 
 2010 : Unstoppable : Horse Trailer Owner 
 2011 : Scream Show 2 : Janet Weaver 
 2012 : Promised Land : Profesora

Awards 
 1996 : ASCAP award for The lover that you are

References

External links 
Official Site
 

Living people
American musical theatre actresses
21st-century American women singers
American people of Italian descent
American pop pianists
American women pianists
Year of birth missing (living people)
21st-century American pianists